Ini (uppercase: Ի, lowercase: ի; Armenian: ինի) is a letter of the Armenian alphabet, used in the Armenian language.

History 
It was developed, together with most of other letters, by Mesrop Mashtots, the creator of the alphabet, between 405 and 406.

Usage 
The letter is used in the Armenian language, where it corresponds to the close front unrounded vowel sound ([i]). In English, it is transliterated as letter I. In Armenian numeral system, the letter corresponds to number 20.

Encodings

References 

Armenian letters